Viby Jylland railway station is a tram-train and railway station serving the district of Viby J in the city of Aarhus in East Jutland, Denmark.

The station is located on the Fredericia-Aarhus Line from Fredericia to Aarhus. It offers regional train services to Aarhus, Esbjerg, Herning and Skjern. The train services are operated by DSB and Arriva.

The station is also located on the Odder Line between Aarhus and Odder, part of the Aarhus light rail system. In 2016 to 2018, the Odder Line was temporarily closed along with the Grenaa Line while it was being reconstructed to form part of the Aarhus light rail system including electrification.

References

Citations

Bibliography

External links

 Banedanmark – government agency responsible for maintenance and traffic control of most of the Danish railway network
 DSB – largest Danish train operating company
 Arriva – British multinational public transport company operating bus and train services in Denmark
 Danske Jernbaner – website with information on railway history in Denmark
 Aarhus Letbane

Railway stations in Aarhus